The Formula Volkswagen South Africa Championship was an open wheel racing series run by Volkswagen and based in South Africa. The cars are the fastest race series in the country.  The inaugural season was in 2008. The most famous drivers to have competed in this series include Gavin Cronje, Maxime Soulet, Wesleigh Orr, Cristiano Morgado and Simon Moss. Tasmin Pepper, a leading South African female driver has been a regular competitor in 2009 and 2010.

In 2010, the series has suffered from reduced numbers of competitors, with grids often totaling less than 15 drivers.  New 6 speed gearboxes are anticipated for the 2011 season.

Champions

See also
Formula Vee

References

External links
Formula Volkswagen South Africa Championship

Formula racing series
Auto racing series in South Africa